Okada Saburōsuke (Japanese: 岡田 三郎助; 12 January 1869, Saga – 23 September 1939, Tokyo) was a Japanese painter in the Yōga style and a professor at the "Tōkyō Bijutsu Gakkō" (School of Fine Arts); precursor of the Tokyo University of the Arts.

Biography 
His parents were vassals of the samurai Nabeshima clan. He attended a school that taught western-style painting, under the tutelage of Soyama Sachihiko (曽山幸彦).

That same year, he came under the influence of Kuroda Seiki (黒田清輝} and Kume Keiichiro (久米桂一郎), who had just returned from France. They introduced him the Barbizon school and the concept of plein-air painting. In 1896, he became an Assistant Professor of Yōga art at the Tōkyō Bijutsu Gakkō. He was also one of the founding members of "Hakuba-kai" (White Horse Society); a loosely organized artists' association, supposedly named after their favorite type of sake.

Later, the Ministry of Culture awarded him a stipend to study in France, where he worked with Raphaël Collin. When he returned in 1902, he was named a full professor. Shortly after, he married the daughter of playwright Osanai Kaoru (小山内薫). After 1907, he served as a juror for the annual art exhibition held by the Ministry (the "Mombushō Tenrankai"). In 1912, he and Fujishima Takeji (藤島武二) founded the "Hongo Institute for Western Painting". Seven years later, he was elected a member of the "Teikoku Bijutsu-in" (Imperial Academy of Fine Arts) and was awarded the Order of the Sacred Treasure.

In 1930, the Ministry of Culture sent him to Europe to speak with Hasegawa Kiyoshi and explore the possibility of staging an exhibition of modern Japanese art. Four years later, he was appointed an Imperial Household Artist.

In 1937, Okada received the Order of Culture., the highest honor in the Japanese cultural world. Overall, his art career showed an unusually smooth progression. Okada's painting subjects included both landscapes and portraits, and he was especially good at painting portraits of women. Under his brush, women were portrayed with warm skin textures, elegant features, and delicate traits. In 1907 he won the first prize of the Tokyo Industrial Exhibition for "Image of a Woman (Purple tone)". Later, he exhibited "Women in Red", "Japanese Bush Clover", and the "Portrait of Marquess Ookuma's Wife", establishing his reputation in painting portraits of women.

Selected paintings

References

Further reading 
Nakamura Heisaburo: Okada Saburōsuke. In: Goto Shigeki (ed.): Gendai Nihon no bijutsu (Modern Japanese Prints), Vol.9. Shueisha, 1977.
Ōsumi, Tamezo:工藝圖譜 : 岡田三郎助蒐集 (Handicraft catalog: Okada Saburosuke's collection), 座右寶刊行會 (Zauhō Kankōkai), 1940.

External links 

ArtNet: More paintings by Okada.

1869 births
1939 deaths
19th-century Japanese painters
Yōga painters
Recipients of the Order of Culture
Recipients of the Order of the Sacred Treasure
People from Saga (city)
20th-century Japanese painters
Imperial household artists
19th-century male artists
20th-century male artists
Artists from Saga Prefecture